Cymothoe fontainei is a butterfly in the family Nymphalidae. It is found in Cameroon, the Republic of the Congo and the Democratic Republic of the Congo.

Subspecies
Cymothoe fontainei fontainei (Democratic Republic of the Congo)
Cymothoe fontainei debauchei Overlaet, 1952 (Congo: Etoumbi, Cameroon: Nyong)

References

Butterflies described in 1952
Cymothoe (butterfly)